The Center of Winter is a novel by the American author Marya Hornbacher. It was published by Harper Perennial in early 2005.

It follows the aftermath of a father's suicide and takes place over the course of a year.

2005 American novels

HarperCollins books
Fiction about suicide